SV Linx is a German association football club from the district of Linx in the city of Rheinau, Baden-Württemberg. It is part of a 340 member sports club that also has departments for gymnastics and volleyball.

History
The club was founded on 12 June 1949 and first advanced out of local competition to regional play in the Landesliga in 1978, followed by a move up to the fourth-tier Verbandsliga Südbaden in 1981. As runners=up in 1987, the team rose to the Oberliga Baden-Württemberg (IV) but were immediately relegated after an 18th-place result. Linx remained a competitive side in the Verbandsliga Südbaden (V) through the late 1980s and into the early 1990s, earning a number of top three finishes until finally breaking through again to the Oberliga in 1993 where they played the next four seasons until being relegated in 1997. During this period the club made its only DFB-Pokal appearance after qualifying by way of a 1994 regional cup win. Linx was knocked out 2–1 in the first round by the Bundesliga side Schalke 04.

The club endured several frustrating seasons through the late 1990s and into the new millennium, with a number of second-place finishes until once more capturing the Verbandbsliga Südbaden (V) title in 2003. SV Linx have since become a yo-yo side, moving frequently between the fourth and fifth tiers. They returned to the Oberliga Baden-Württemberg (IV) for the 2007–08 season but a last place finish send them straight down again.

The club finished second in the Verbandsliga in 2008–09, which entitled it to take part in the promotion round to the Oberliga, where it lost both games to TSG 62/09 Weinheim and was knocked out. The following season, the club achieved its fourth promotion to the Oberliga since 2003, followed by its fourth relegation in 2011.

Honours

League
 Verbandsliga Südbaden (V)
 Champions: 1993, 2003, 2005, 2007, 2010, 2018
 Runners-up: 1987, 1989, 1992, 1999, 2000, 2002, 2009, 2014

Cup
 South Baden Cup
 Winners: 1994, 2018
 Runners-up: 2012

Recent managers
Recent managers of the club:

Recent seasons
The recent season-by-season performance of the club:

 With the introduction of the Regionalligas in 1994 and the 3. Liga in 2008 as the new third tier, below the 2. Bundesliga, all leagues below dropped one tier.

Key

References

Sources
Grüne, Hardy (2001). Vereinslexikon. Kassel: AGON Sportverlag

External links
Official team site
SV Linx profile at Weltfussball.de
Das deutsche Fußball-Archiv historical German domestic league tables 

Football clubs in Germany
Football clubs in Baden-Württemberg
Association football clubs established in 1949
1949 establishments in West Germany